This article attempts to list the oldest houses built in the Commonwealth of Massachusetts, United States from settlement to 1659. The first immigrant houses built in the Plymouth and Massachusetts Bay colony are known as first generation structures. These were built upon settlement (1620) until about 1660 "when the first immigrant generation of preponderantly younger settlers had come to full maturity". While dozens of existing homes are thought to have been built before 1660, proving their age scientifically is another matter. Just one example built during this time period known as the Fairbanks House has been proven through dendrochronology. The rest of the examples are approximate (indicated with a "circa" or "c.") and based on architectural studies and historical records. Its estimated that only five houses in total have been documented enough to firmly establish they were built during this time period. Only First Period houses built prior to 1660 are suitable for inclusion on this list as construction methods changed circa 1660. All entries should include citation with reference to: 17th century architectural features; a report by an architectural historian; or dendrochronology whenever possible.

Legend

List of houses

See also
 List of historic houses in Massachusetts
 Oldest buildings in the United States
 First Period houses in Ipswich, Massachusetts

Notes

References

Further reading

 
Houses completed in the 17th century
17th century in Massachusetts
Massachusetts
Houses in Massachusetts
Oldest
Colonial architecture in Massachusetts
Massachusetts history-related lists